Surviving My Mother is a 2007 Canadian comedy-drama film.

Plot
Clara's mother (Le Flaguais) is on her deathbed as she tells her daughter (David) that she regrets they are not closer. This revelation causes Clara to pursue a closer relationship with her own daughter, Bianca (Dhavernas).

Recognition
 Genie Award for Best Performance by an Actress in a Supporting Role - Véronique Le Flaguais - nominee

External links
 
 
 

2007 films
2007 comedy-drama films
Films set in Montreal
Films shot in Montreal
Canadian comedy-drama films
Films directed by Émile Gaudreault
French-language Canadian films
2000s Canadian films